Burt Township is the name of some places in the U.S. state of Michigan:

 Burt Township, Alger County, Michigan
 Burt Township, Cheboygan County, Michigan

See also 
 Burt, Michigan, an unincorporated community in Saginaw County

Michigan township disambiguation pages